Achreamie is a village in the Scottish council area of Highland.

References

Populated places in Caithness